Stadtilm is a town in the Ilm-Kreis district, in Thuringia, Germany. It is situated on the river Ilm, 15 km northeast of Ilmenau, and 11 km southeast of Arnstadt. In July 2018 the former municipality of Ilmtal was merged into Stadtilm.

Mayors

History
Within the German Empire (1871-1918), Stadtilm was part of the Principality of Schwarzburg-Rudolstadt.

Notable people 

 Friedrich Fröbel (1782–1852), educator, grew up after 1792 in Stadtilm

References

Towns in Thuringia
Ilm-Kreis
Schwarzburg-Rudolstadt